Hansa Destinations is a Swedish ferry line that runs  ferries from Nynäshamn and Visby in Sweden to Rostock in Germany. It is a wholly owned daughter company of Rederi AB Gotland. The fleet consists of one ferry.

Destinations
Gotland,  
Nynäshamn, 
Rostock,

References

External links
 Company website

Ferry companies of Sweden